Richard le Goz (d. 1082 or after), was a Norman nobleman and supporter of William the Conqueror in the Norman conquest of England.

Richard was the son of Thorstein le Goz, Viscount of Avranches, and grandson of Ansfred 'the Dane'. William II, Duke of Normandy, bestowed on him the title of Viscount of Avranches sometime before 1046. Richard may also have been Lord of Creully and entrusted with the castle of Saint-James-de-Beuvron, built by William in 1067 shortly after the war against the Bretons of 1064-66.

Richard provided 60 ships to support William's 1066 invasion of England but is not among those known to have been present at the Battle of Hastings. Between 1070 and 1079, Richard was involved in a ruling between Raoul Tesson and the Abbey of Fontenay. Around 1076 he was one of the judges who pronounced an award against Robert Bertram.

Richard married Emma, who is believed to have been the daughter of Herluin de Conteville and Herleva (mistress of Robert I of Normandy and mother of William the Conqueror), and hence a sister of Robert, Count of Mortain and Odo, Bishop of Bayeux.  Richard and Emma had five known children and probably more:
 Hugh d’Avranches, Earl of Chester and Viscount of Avranches
 Helisende, married to William II, Count of Eu
 Gilbert d'Avranches, Lord of Marcey
 Margaret, married to Ranulf de Briquessart.  Their son was Ranulf le Meschin, 3rd Earl of Chester
 Judith, married to Richer de l'Aigle (died in the Battle of Saint-Suzanne).

Richard le Goz died in 1082 and was succeeded by his son Hugh as Viscount of Avranches.

Sources 

Keats-Rohan, K,  Domesday People: A Prosopography of Persons Occurring in English Documents, 1066-1166, Vol I. Boydell Press, Suffolk, 1999

Lewis, C. P., Avranches, Hugh d', first earl of Chester (d. 1101), Oxford Dictionary of National Biography, Oxford University Press, 2004.

Douglas, David C., William the Conqueror, University of California Press, 1992

References 

Norman conquest of England